Bigamy is a 1922 German silent drama film directed by Rudolf Walther-Fein and starring Alfred Abel, Margit Barnay, and Reinhold Schünzel.

The film's sets were designed by the art director Siegfried Wroblewsky.

Cast

References

Bibliography

External links

1922 films
Films of the Weimar Republic
German silent feature films
German black-and-white films
1922 drama films
German drama films
Films directed by Rudolf Walther-Fein
Films based on works by Leo Tolstoy
German films based on plays
Silent drama films
1920s German films